Arambaré is a municipality in the state of Rio Grande do Sul, Brazil. It is bordered by Tapes on the north, Camaquã on the west and south, and Lagoa dos Patos on the east. It is at km 396 of the BR-116, 33 km from Camaquã. It is 156 km from Porto Alegre.

Arambaré, in Guarani, means "priest who shines light." Its origin was the Tape people, who populated the Lagoa dos Patos coast. Later the place was known as Barra do Velhaco and Paraguaçu. Dunas da Lua de Natal and Prainha are two of the baths found in the city.

In summer, tourism is the most important industry. The rural area is known for its rice and livestock.

The city is well known for its Carnaval, when thousands of tourists visit.

References

External links
 Official site

Municipalities in Rio Grande do Sul